The seafan blenny (Emblemariopsis pricei) is a species of chaenopsid blenny found in Glover's Reef, on the coasts of Belize and Honduras, in the western Atlantic ocean. It can reach a maximum length of  SL. The specific name honours the premier of Belize at the time Greenfield was give permission to collect specimens in Bleize, George C. Price (1919-2011).

References
 Greenfield, D.W., 1975 (31 Dec.) Emblemariopsis pricei, a new species of chaenopsid blenny from Belize. Copeia 1975 (no. 4): 713–715.

pricei
Fauna of Belize
Fish of Honduras
Fish described in 1975